Leonard George Wolf (October 29, 1925 – March 28, 1970) was a one-term Democratic U.S. Representative from Iowa's 2nd congressional district. He was elected in 1958 and defeated in 1960 when seeking re-election.

Born on a farm in Dane County, Wisconsin, near Mazomanie, Wolf attended the public schools of Mazomanie, Wisconsin.
He served in the United States Navy from 1944 to 1946, in the Pacific Ocean theater of World War II.
He graduated from the University of Wisconsin–Madison in agricultural economics in 1949 and moved to Elkader, Iowa, the same year.
In Elkader, he worked as a retail feed dealer from 1952 to 1958, while delivering public speeches and lectures.

Wolf tried and failed to win election to the U.S. House in 1956, running against longtime incumbent Republican Henry O. Talle. His chances were aided by a drop in farm prices but hurt by the presence of a popular president at the top of the Republican ticket. Wolf lost, but received a higher percentage of the votes than any of Talle's previous opponents.

In the mid-term elections two years later, the prices farmers received for their products had increased, but not enough to counterbalance an even greater increase in costs, leading to an anti-Republican mood among the farmers and farm communities that served as the Republicans' traditional base in Iowa. That year, the parties' candidates in the district were the same as in 1956 and the election again was close, but the outcome was different; Wolf unseated Talle.

However, in 1960, as part of good year for Republicans in Iowa, Wolf was unseated by Republican James E. Bromwell. Wolf's congressional service began January 3, 1959, and ended January 3, 1961.

After leaving Congress, Wolf was active in efforts to prevent starvation and malnutrition.  In 1961 was appointed special assistant to the director of the International Cooperation Administration's Mission in Brazil, where he served until 1965. He coordinated the child feeding program for Latin America (in 1966) and in India following a drought (in 1967). In 1968, he was appointed executive director of the American Freedom From Hunger Foundation.

Wolf died March 28, 1970, in Washington, D.C. He was interred in St. Barnabas Cemetery, Mazomanie, Wisconsin.

References

Sources

1925 births
1970 deaths
People from Mazomanie, Wisconsin
People from Elkader, Iowa
University of Wisconsin–Madison College of Agricultural and Life Sciences alumni
United States Navy personnel of World War II
Democratic Party members of the United States House of Representatives from Iowa
20th-century American politicians